Elderberry Forebay is a small reservoir in Los Angeles County, California, which serves as the pumping forebay of the Castaic Power Plant. It located at the upper end of the larger Castaic Lake and is separated from the lake by Elderberry Forebay Dam at its southern edge. Entering the northern end of the forebay is the west branch of the California Aqueduct, which connects the forebay to Pyramid Lake through the Angeles Tunnel.

A component of the California State Water Project, the reservoir was partitioned from Castaic Lake in 1974 to store water for pumped-storage hydroelectricity generation. During on-peak energy-demand hours, water flows  from Pyramid Lake through the Angeles Tunnel and then on to the turbines of the Castaic Power Plant, producing electricity. From there, the water flows into Elderberry Forebay. During off-peak hours (including nighttime and Sundays), water is pumped from the forebay, back through the tunnel and into Pyramid Lake.

See also
 California State Water Project
 California Aqueduct
 Castaic Power Plant

References

California State Water Project
Reservoirs in Los Angeles County, California
Sierra Pelona Ridge
Reservoirs in Southern California
1974 establishments in California